Shruti Sharma is an Indian model, beauty pageant contestant and actress. She was the first runner up and winner of Miss India World title at the 2002 Femina Miss India pageant. She represented India at the 2002 Miss World pageant held at London and made it to the semi-finals. She was also an unplaced contestant in the 2001 Miss India pageant.

Sharma's parents are Sushil and Mrinal Sharma. She did her schooling at Mussoorie and attended the Jesus and Mary College (JMC), Delhi.  She has also acted in the Bollywood movie Tezaab - The Acid of Love.

References

External links
 
 

1981 births
Living people
Indian film actresses
21st-century Indian actresses
Actresses in Hindi cinema
Female models from Uttarakhand
Indian beauty pageant winners
Miss World 2002 delegates
Delhi University alumni